Pravda is a rural locality (a settlement) in Beryozovsky Selsoviet, Pervomaysky District, Altai Krai, Russia. The population was 447 as of 2013. There are 6 streets.

Geography 
Pravda is located 17 km east of Novoaltaysk (the district's administrative centre) by road. Beryozovka is the nearest rural locality.

References 

Rural localities in Pervomaysky District, Altai Krai